Mogra Village Known as (MOGRA PADA)  is a small area in Mumbai, Maharashtra, India, which lies in the suburb of Mumbai near Andheri East Station
Nearest railway station - Andheri East

Known Area :- Saduwada, Raja Nagar, Khachad etc.

Suburbs of Mumbai
Villages in Mumbai Suburban district